The 1904 Nashville Garnet and Blue football team represented the University of Nashville during the 1904 Southern Intercollegiate Athletic Association football season.

Schedule

References

Nashville
Nashville Garnet and Blue football seasons
Nashville Garnet and Blue football